Koninklijke Sint-Niklase Sportkring Excelsior was a Belgian football club from the town of Sint-Niklaas that merged with KSC Lokeren in 2000, establishing K.S.C. Lokeren Oost-Vlaanderen.

It was created in 1920 as F.C. Beerschot but the name changed a year later to V.V. Beerschot Sint-Niklaas.  The club then registered to the Belgian FA as Sint-Niklaassche S.K. in 1922 and received the matricule n°221.  Right after World War II, Sint-Niklaassche qualified for the first division but only stayed at that level for two seasons.  Following the relegation, the name changed to Sint-Niklaasse S.K. and then to K. Sint-Niklase S.K. in 1974.

References
Belgian football clubs history
RSSSF Archive

Association football clubs established in 1920
Defunct football clubs in Belgium
Association football clubs disestablished in 2000
1920 establishments in Belgium
2000 disestablishments in Belgium
Sport in East Flanders
Organisations based in Belgium with royal patronage
Belgian Pro League clubs
Sint-Niklaas